Jameel Neptune (born 19 July 1993) is a Trinidadian professional footballer who plays as both defender and midfielder for Central.

Career

After playing for Trinidadian lower league side Malabar, Neptune signed for Morvant Caledonia United in the top flight. However, his quality of training was affected by the fact that the club had no designated training ground.

As of 2018, he has made 2 appearances for the Trinidad and Tobago national team.

In 2021, he participated in the 2021 CONCACAF Futsal Championship with the Trinidad and Tobago national futsal team.

References

External links

 Jameel Neptune at National Football Teams

Trinidad and Tobago footballers
Living people
Association football midfielders
Association football defenders
1993 births
Trinidad and Tobago international footballers